Leadership High School is a public charter high school located in San Francisco. Founded in 1997, Leadership or "LHS" was California's first start-up charter high school. The school provides a college-preparatory curriculum and focuses on leadership development and social justice.

During the school's first two years, it operated out of Golden Gate University. It then moved to the Excelsior District and occupied an elementary school facility owned by San Francisco Unified School District. In January 2007, the school was forced to move from that location, because the building was determined to not be earthquake-safe. Between January 2007 and June 2008, the school shared a facility with Philip and Sala Burton High School. Between August 2008 and spring 2015, the school shared a facility with James Denman Middle School, exclusively occupying the top floor of the building. As of Spring 2015, Leadership is again occupying its original Excelsior District site, after SFUSD completed a modernization project there. The current address of the school is 350 Seneca Avenue, San Francisco, CA.

The school enrolls approximately 270 students. By 2012, there were over  500 graduates,  with over 95% going on to college.

(This school is not related to "Leadership Public Schools," a network of 4 charter high schools in the San Francisco Bay Area.)
  
The school has had four leaders in its history. The school is led by Principal Beth Silbergeld. School web site

NOTE, Leadership High School merged with City Arts and Tech High School in 2022 to become City Arts and Leadership Academy

Coalition of Essential Schools (CES)
In 1997 Leadership became a Coalition of Essential Schools National Affiliate School.

Demographics

According to U.S. News & World Report, 99% of Leadership's student body is "of color," with 73% of the student body coming from an economically disadvantaged household, determined by student eligibility for California's Reduced-price meal program.

See also

San Francisco County high schools

References

External links
Leadership High School - official website
SFUSD portal page
CALFEE, SF public schools guide

Coalition of Essential Schools
High schools in San Francisco
Charter high schools in California
1997 establishments in California